Carlos García is a Colombian professional soccer player formerly of the Baltimore Blast in the MISL.

Career

Youth
García was born and raised in Colombia.  He learned to play soccer at the Academia Tucamán in his hometown of Cali, Valle del Cauca.  The club played at a very high level by local youth soccer standards.  His long-time teammate and friend at Tucamán, Daniel Cruz, left the academy at 17 to join AFC Ajax in Amsterdam and now plays in the Belgian Pro league.

College
García came to the United States in 1999 via a soccer scholarship to The College of William and Mary.  He was identified by William and Mary head coach Al Albert when his high school soccer team attended Albert's Tidewater Soccer Camp in Virginia.  Carlos's physical style of play was well-suited for NCAA soccer.

García was a First-Team All-South Atlantic Region selection his last season playing for the William and Mary Tribe.  He recorded nine goals and 11 assists his final year to lead the Tribe to the third round of the NCAA Tournament.  Carlos recorded 121 points throughout his William & Mary career and graduated in 2003.

A-League
García spent the 2003 and 2004 seasons with the professional outdoor team the Virginia Beach Mariners.  He recorded five goals and nine assists in 25 games in 2004 and was named A-League Player of the Week on August 10.  He ranked second in the A-League that season with nine assists to teammates.

Baltimore Blast
García is one of the most accomplished team players in the history of American professional indoor soccer.

On November 14, 2003, García scored a goal on the first shift of his first professional indoor soccer game.  For the following eight seasons Carlos was an integral part of the highly successful Baltimore Blast indoor soccer team, which competed in the MISL.  A rough player with an eye for goal, in the 2006–07 season, García ranked third among Blast players in points (42) and led the entire league in penalty minutes (27).  He played in his 100th game for the Blast against the New Jersey Ironmen on February 16, 2008.  Carlos was an integral part of the club's championship squads in 2004, 2006, 2008, and 2009.

Personal
García is known to friends and family simply as "Charlie".

References

1981 births
Living people
Footballers from Cali
Association football defenders
Baltimore Blast (2001–2008 MISL) players
Baltimore Blast (2008–2014 MISL) players
Colombian expatriate footballers
Colombian expatriate sportspeople in the United States
Colombian footballers
Expatriate soccer players in the United States
Soccer players from Maryland
William & Mary Tribe men's soccer players
Virginia Beach Mariners players
Montreal Impact (1992–2011) players
A-League (1995–2004) players
USL First Division players

es:Carlos Garcia